is a railway station located in Nishi-ku, Nagoya, Aichi, Japan.

The name Sakō is thought to bring good fortune.

This station provides access to Meitetsu Hospital.

Line
Nagoya Railroad
Meitetsu Nagoya Main Line

Passengers can change trains between the Nagoya Main Line and the Inuyama Line.

Layout
Sakō Station has one island platform serving two tracks.

Platform

Adjacent stations

References

External links
 
 Station guide 

Railway stations in Japan opened in 1941
Stations of Nagoya Railroad
Railway stations in Aichi Prefecture